USS Gadsden (AK-182) was an  acquired by the U.S. Navy during the final months of World War II. She served the Pacific Ocean theatre of operations for a short period of time before being decommissioned and returned to the U.S. Maritime Administration.

Construction
Gadsden was launched 8 April 1944, under Maritime Commission contract, MC hull 2113, by Walter Butler Shipbuilders, Inc., Superior, Wisconsin; sponsored by Mrs. Morgan Murphy of Superior; acquired by the Navy on loan-charter basis 26 December 1944; and commissioned at New Orleans, Louisiana, 28 February 1945.

Service history

World War II service
After shakedown in the Gulf of Mexico, Gadsden departed New Orleans 31 March 1945, with a cargo of frozen meat and ammunition for Ulithi, Western Caroline Islands, where she arrived on 11 May after 34 days at sea. From there she proceeded to Kossol Roads, Palau Islands for a 3-day stay marked by alerts for enemy suicide swimmers.

She was convoyed by way of Leyte to Morotai Island, Netherlands East Indies, where she spent 3 months as ammunition ship for units of the U.S. 7th Fleet. At times, she serviced six to eight ships a day as she handled much of the ammunition used by fleet units for the Brunei Bay-Balikpapan invasions of Borneo.
 
Gadsden arrived at Leyte 31 July 1945, with about one-third of her cargo. She served as ammunition ship there until announcement of the Japanese capitulation. On 21 August 1945, she departed Leyte on a shuttle cargo run to Subic Bay, Philippine Islands, and Hollandia, New Guinea; thence back to Leyte and was routed onward to Manila, Philippine Islands.

Post-war decommissioning
Gadsden put to sea from Manila 26 November 1945; transited the Panama Canal 8 January 1946; and reached Norfolk, Virginia, on the 19th for inactivation. She decommissioned 31 January 1946 and was redelivered to the Maritime Commission on 1 February 1946 for layup in the Maritime James River fleet.

Merchant service
On 16 August 1946, the Maritime Commission sold Gadsden to American Eastern Corp., of New York, New York, for $693,862. She wasn't reflagged and she retained her name.

The Maritime Administration, which the Maritime Commission had been renamed in 1950, purchased Gadsden back on 23 May 1955, at Seattle, Washington. She was subsequently sold to the Korean Shipping Corp., and renamed Yosu. The ship was scrapped at Inchon on 7 September 1979 by the Han Sung Salvage Co.

Honors and awards
Qualified Gadsden personnel were eligible for the following:
 American Campaign Medal
 Asiatic-Pacific Campaign Medal
 World War II Victory Medal
 Philippines Liberation Medal

Notes 

Citations

Bibliography 

Online resources

External links

 

Alamosa-class cargo ships
Gadsden County, Florida
Ships built in Superior, Wisconsin
1944 ships
World War II auxiliary ships of the United States
Ammunition ships of the United States Navy